

2014 South Australian Rally Championship Calendar

*Robertstown Walky 100 was postponed due to flooding rain. 
**Walky Stages

References 
Results for Previous Events

Rally competitions in Australia